Lee Gyeong-hui (born 17 June 1970) is a South Korean field hockey player. She competed in the women's tournament at the 1992 Summer Olympics.

References

External links
 

1970 births
Living people
South Korean female field hockey players
Olympic field hockey players of South Korea
Field hockey players at the 1992 Summer Olympics
Place of birth missing (living people)